DBLP is a computer science bibliography website. Starting in 1993 at Universität Trier in Germany, it grew from a small collection of HTML files and became an organization hosting a database and logic programming bibliography site. Since November 2018, DBLP is a branch of Schloss Dagstuhl – Leibniz-Zentrum für Informatik (LZI). DBLP listed more than 5.4 million journal articles, conference papers, and other publications on computer science in December 2020, up from about 14,000 in 1995 and 3.66 million in July 2016. All important journals on computer science are tracked. Proceedings papers of many conferences are also tracked. It is mirrored at three sites across the Internet.

For his work on maintaining DBLP, Michael Ley received an award from the Association for Computing Machinery (ACM) and the VLDB Endowment Special Recognition Award in 1997. Furthermore, he was awarded the ACM Distinguished Service Award for "creating, developing, and curating DBLP" in 2019.

DBLP originally stood for DataBase systems and Logic Programming. As a backronym, it has been taken to stand for Digital Bibliography & Library Project; however, it is now preferred that the acronym be simply a name, hence the new title "The DBLP Computer Science Bibliography".

DBL-Browser

DBL-Browser (Digital Bibliographic Library Browser) is a utility for browsing the DBLP website. The browser was written by Alexander Weber in 2005 at the University of Trier. It was designed for use off-line in reading the DBLP, which consisted of 696,000 bibliographic entries in 2005 (and in 2015 has more than 2.9 million).

DBL-Browser is GPL software, available for download from SourceForge. It uses the XML DTD. Written in Java programming language, this code shows the bibliographic entry in several types of screens, ranging from graphics to text:
Author page
Article page
Table of contents
Related conferences / journals
Related authors (graphic representation of relationships)
Trend analysis (graphics histogram)

DBLP is similar to the bibliographic portion of arxiv.org which also links to articles. DBL-Browser provides a means to view some of the associated computer science articles.

See also
List of academic databases and search engines
Association for Computational Linguistics
CiteSeerX
CogPrints
Google Scholar
Live Search Academic
The Collection of Computer Science Bibliographies
Dagstuhl

References

External links

 
 CompleteSearch DBLP provides a fast search-as-you-type interface to DBLP, as well as faceted search. It is maintained by Hannah Bast and synchronized twice daily with the DBLP database. Since December 2007, the search functionality is embedded into each DBLP author page (via JavaScript).
 
 
 FacetedDBLP provides a faceted search interface to DBLP, synchronized once per week with the DBLP database. In addition to common facets such as year, author, or venues, it contains a topic-based facet summarizing and characterizing the current result set based on the author keywords for individual publications. For the DBLP data, FacetedDBLP also provides an RDF dump (using D2R server  technology) as well as an SQL dump based on the underlying mysql database.
 confsearch Conference search engine and calendar based on DBLP.
 CloudMining DBLP is another faceted search solution with different visualizations.

Bibliographic databases and indexes
German digital libraries
Bibliographic databases in computer science
Internet properties established in 1993
1993 establishments in Germany
University of Trier